William R. Walker (April 14, 1830 – March 11, 1905) was an American architect from Providence, Rhode Island, who was later the senior partner of William R. Walker & Son.

Early life
Major-General William Russell Walker was born on April 14, 1830, in a part of Seekonk, Massachusetts that is presently part of East Providence, Rhode Island, to Alfred and Huldah Walker.  He attended the public schools, and graduated from the Seekonk Classical Seminary in 1846.  For three years he was a builder's apprentice in Providence, and studied architectural drawing at Scholfield's Commercial College in his free time.  In 1850 he went to Augusta, Georgia, but returned to Pawtucket the following year, where he would live for the rest of his life.  In 1861 he was commissioned first lieutenant of Company E of the 1st Rhode Island Detached Militia. The regiment mustered out three months later in August.

Architectural career
In 1864, Walker established himself as an architect in Providence's Merchants Bank Building, moving to the Reynolds Building (37 Weybosset) by 1871.  In 1874 his son, W. Howard Walker, entered the office as a student and draftsman. Walker practiced alone until January 1876, when he made Thomas J. Gould, draftsman since 1868, partner in Walker & Gould.  In about 1878, Walker & Gould moved into their new Vaughan Building, on Custom House Street.  Walker & Gould was dissolved as of January 1881, and the Walkers formed a new firm, William R. Walker & Son.  Gould established Gould & Angell with Frank W. Angell, another Walker draftsman.  During the 1880s to 1890s, Walker & Son grew to become one of the state's largest firms.

Walker continued in his position as senior partner until his death in 1905.  His son (died 1922) and grandson (died 1936) each operated the firm until their deaths.

Personal life
In 1852, Walker married Eliza B. Hall, who died in 1895.  They had two children, George Clinton (1853-1883) and William Howard (1856-1922), the latter of whom was associated with him in his business.

Walker was politically active.  He was a member of the North Providence town council, as well as that of Pawtucket when it incorporated as an independent town, and served two terms in the Rhode Island general assembly.  He was active in the state militia for twenty years, retiring with the rank of major-general.  It was through his many political connections that Walker obtained so many public commissions throughout the state.

Walker died on March 11, 1905. He is buried at Swan Point Cemetery.

Selected works

William R. Walker, 1864-1875

Walker & Gould, 1876-1880

Gallery

References

External links
 

1830 births
1905 deaths
19th-century American architects
Burials at Swan Point Cemetery
People from Seekonk, Massachusetts
Architects from Providence, Rhode Island
Union Army officers
Military personnel from Massachusetts